Ponnunjal is a 1973 Indian Tamil-language film, directed by C. V. Rajendran and produced by K. S. Kutralingam. The film stars Sivaji Ganesan and Ushanandini. It was released on 15 June 1973.

Plot

Cast 
Sivaji Ganesan as Muthu
Ushanandini as Valli
R. Muthuraman as Minor Manickam
M. N. Nambiar as Ponnan
S. V. Sahasranamam as Sivalingam
Sriranjani Jr. as Sengamalam
S. V. Subbaiah as Komberi Devan
Ganthimathi as Velaee
K. A. Thangavelu as Pethaperumal
Cho as Singaram
Manorama as Veeramma
A. Sakunthala as Sundari
S. A. Kannan as Village Panchayat Head
A. Veerappan as Sappani
Usilai Mani as Iyer

Soundtrack 
The music was composed by M. S. Viswanathan, while the lyrics were written by Kannadasan, Selvabharathy and "Nellai" Arulmani.

References

External links 
 

1970s Tamil-language films
1973 films
Films directed by C. V. Rajendran
Films scored by M. S. Viswanathan